Now Kandeh District is a district (bakhsh) in Bandar-e-Gaz County, Golestan Province, Iran. At the 2006 census, its population was 15,133, in 4,120 families.  The District has one city: Now Kandeh.  The District has two rural districts (dehestan): Banafsh Tappeh Rural District and Livan Rural District.

References 

Districts of Golestan Province
Bandar-e Gaz County